S. Ramachandran may refer to:

S. Ramachandran (filmmaker), Indian film journalist and director
S. Ramachandran (scientist) (1934–2016), Indian biotechnologist
S. M. Ramachandran, Indian politician in Tamil Nadu
Srinivasan Ramachandran, Indian bioinformatician
Subramaniam Ramachandran, missing Sri Lankan Tamil journalist
N. S. Ramachandran (1908–?), Indian composer of Carnatic music
Panruti S. Ramachandran (born 1937), Indian politician in Tamil Nadu
V. S. Ramachandran (born 1951), Indian-American neuroscientist
S. Ramachandran Pillai (born 1938), Indian communist politician from Kerala